Asterio Mañanós Martínez (21 October 1861 – ) was a Spanish painter who specialized in portraits and Costumbrista. He was also the curator for the historical artworks preserved in the Spanish Senate.

Biography 
He was born in Palencia, where he began his studies at the Escuela Municipal de Dibujo de Palencia.  In 1877, he continued at the Escuela de Bellas Artes de San Fernando in Madrid, where he studied with Casto Plasencia and José Casado del Alisal. He also made frequent visits to the Museo del Prado and made copies of Diego Velázquez. In 1881, he had his first showing at the National Exhibition of Fine Arts. He then divided his time between Madrid and Palencia, where he painted the curtains and backdrops for the "Teatro de Recreo Palentino".

In 1885, he received a fellowship from the "Diputación Provincial de Palencia" (the local government) to further his education at the "Real Academia de España en Roma" for a period of one year. Upon his return, he and another local artist were commissioned to decorate the "Teatro de la Peña Palentina". Also, he entered into a partnership to open a school of drawing named after his former teacher, Casado del Alisal. Despite this new commitment, he moved to Paris in 1889 to study Realism with Léon Bonnat. He stayed for a year, then returned to Spain and set up a studio in Madrid.

In 1908, following some restorations he had done for the Spanish Senate, a committee named him the curator of its art collection. He created some of his best-known works as a result of this relationship: large canvases portraying the Senate in session. One of his final paintings was an allegory on the Second Republic. He was last heard from in 1935. The exact date, whereabouts and circumstances of his death are unknown. Speculation has centered on events related to the Spanish Civil War.

References

Further reading 
 Arturo Caballero Bastardo, Exposición antológica. Asterio Mañanós. 1861-1935, Palencia, Cajapalencia, 1988.

External links 

Joaquín Sorolla (blog) Portrait of Asterio Mañanós Martínez.
Palacio del Senado de España -Salón de Conferencias del Senado en 1904. 
 Palacio del Senado de España -El acta de la anterior: Salón de Sesiones del Senado, en 1906. 
 Palacio del Senado de España -Salón de la presidencia del Senado, en octubre de 1915.

1861 births
1930s deaths
People from Palencia
19th-century Spanish painters
Spanish male painters
20th-century Spanish painters
20th-century Spanish male artists
Real Academia de Bellas Artes de San Fernando alumni
19th-century Spanish male artists